The Oryx Cup is a hydroplane boat race in the H1 Unlimited season. The race was held in November in Doha Bay on the Persian Gulf in Doha, Ad Dawhah, Qatar. From 2009-2014, the Oryx Cup was designated as the host for the UIM World Championship.

History
The Oryx Cup was founded in January 2009 when H1 Unlimited and the Qatar Marine Sports Federation (QMSF) reached an agreement to have the final race of the 2009 H1 Unlimited hydroplane season in Doha, Qatar. The 2009 event was also sanctioned as the UIM Unlimited Hydroplane World Championship.

For the 2010-2014 H1 Unlimited seasons, the Oryx Cup was designated as the host of the UIM H1 Unlimited Oryx Cup World Championship.

List of Oryx Cup winners

List of Prior UIM World Unlimited Hydroplane Champions 
The following list are winners of UIM sanctioned unlimited (Gold Cup class) hydroplane world championship events.

Note: The 1961 World Championship Seafair Trophy (won by Ron Musson of Miss Bardahl) was not a sanctioned UIM event

References

External links
Oryx Cup website
H1 Unlimited website

H1 Unlimited
Racing motorboats
Hydroplanes
Sports competitions in Doha
Recurring sporting events established in 2009
2009 establishments in Qatar